The Philippine House Committee on Civil Service and Professional Regulation, or House Civil Service and Professional Regulation Committee is a standing committee of the Philippine House of Representatives.

Jurisdiction 
As prescribed by House Rules, the committee's jurisdiction includes the following:
 Organization, operation, management, rules and regulations of the civil service
 Regulation of admission to and the practice of professions
 Status, welfare and benefits of government officers and employees

Members, 18th Congress

See also 
 House of Representatives of the Philippines
 List of Philippine House of Representatives committees
 Civil Service Commission of the Philippines
 Professional Regulation Commission

References

External links 
House of Representatives of the Philippines

Civil Service and Professional Regulation